Black Island is an abandoned community in Newfoundland and Labrador.

Black Island is made up of two islands and the cemetery is on Little Black Island. According to the 1921 Census there were 153 people living there. This cemetery is very over grown. A number of stones were broken.

See also
 List of ghost towns in Newfoundland and Labrador

Ghost towns in Newfoundland and Labrador